Solar power is the conversion of energy from sunlight into electricity, either directly using photovoltaics (PV) or indirectly using concentrated solar power. Photovoltaic cells convert light into an electric current using the photovoltaic effect. Concentrated solar power systems use lenses or mirrors and solar tracking systems to focus a large area of sunlight to a hot spot, often to drive a steam turbine.

Photovoltaics were initially solely used as a source of electricity for small and medium-sized applications, from the calculator powered by a single solar cell to remote homes powered by an off-grid rooftop PV system. Commercial concentrated solar power plants were first developed in the 1980s. Since then, as the cost of solar electricity has fallen, grid-connected solar PV systems have grown more or less exponentially. Millions of installations and gigawatt-scale photovoltaic power stations continue to be built, with half of new generation capacity being solar in 2021.

In 2021 solar generated 3.8% (1040 TWh) of the world's electricity-compared to 1% (253 TWh) in 2015 when the Paris Agreement to limit climate change was signed. Wind and solar generated over 10% of the world's electricity in 2021. Along with onshore wind, the cheapest levelised cost of electricity is utility-scale solar.

Much more low carbon power, such as solar, is urgently needed to limit climate change, but the International Energy Agency said in 2022 that more effort was needed for grid integration and the mitigation of policy, regulation and financing challenges.

Potential 
Geography affects solar energy potential because areas that are closer to the equator have a higher amount of solar radiation. However, the use of photovoltaics that can follow the position of the Sun can significantly increase the solar energy potential in areas that are farther from the equator. Time variation effects the potential of solar energy because during the nighttime, there is little solar radiation on the surface of the Earth for solar panels to absorb. This limits the amount of energy that solar panels can absorb in one day. Cloud cover can affect the potential of solar panels because clouds block incoming light from the Sun and reduce the light available for solar cells.

Besides, land availability has a large effect on the available solar energy because solar panels can only be set up on land that is otherwise unused and suitable for solar panels. Roofs are a suitable place for solar cells, as many people have discovered that they can collect energy directly from their homes this way. Other areas that are suitable for solar cells are lands that are not being used for businesses where solar plants can be established.

Technologies 

Solar power plants use one of two technologies:
 Photovoltaic (PV) systems use solar panels, either on rooftops or in ground-mounted solar farms, converting sunlight directly into electric power. 
 Concentrated solar power (CSP) uses mirrors or lenses to concentrate sunlight to extreme heat to eventually make steam, which is converted into electricity by a turbine.

Photovoltaic cells 

A solar cell, or photovoltaic cell, is a device that converts light into electric current using the photovoltaic effect. The first solar cell was constructed by Charles Fritts in the 1880s. The German industrialist Ernst Werner von Siemens was among those who recognized the importance of this discovery. In 1931, the German engineer Bruno Lange developed a photo cell using silver selenide in place of copper oxide, although the prototype selenium cells converted less than 1% of incident light into electricity. Following the work of Russell Ohl in the 1940s, researchers Gerald Pearson, Calvin Fuller and Daryl Chapin created the silicon solar cell in 1954. These early solar cells cost US$286/watt and reached efficiencies of 4.5–6%. In 1957, Mohamed M. Atalla developed the process of silicon surface passivation by thermal oxidation at Bell Labs. The surface passivation process has since been critical to solar cell efficiency.

 over 90% of the market is crystalline silicon. The array of a photovoltaic system, or PV system, produces direct current (DC) power which fluctuates with the sunlight's intensity. 
For practical use this usually requires conversion to alternating current (AC), through the use of inverters. 
Multiple solar cells are connected inside panels.
Panels are wired together to form arrays, then tied to an inverter, which produces power at the desired voltage, and for AC, the desired frequency/phase.

Many residential PV systems are connected to the grid wherever available, especially in developed countries with large markets. 
In these grid-connected PV systems, use of energy storage is optional. 
In certain applications such as satellites, lighthouses, or in developing countries, batteries or additional power generators are often added as back-ups. Such stand-alone power systems permit operations at night and at other times of limited sunlight.

Thin-film solar

A thin-film solar cell is a second generation solar cell that is made by depositing one or more thin layers, or thin film (TF) of photovoltaic material on a substrate, such as glass, plastic or metal. Thin-film solar cells are commercially used in several technologies, including cadmium telluride (CdTe), copper indium gallium diselenide (CIGS), and amorphous thin-film silicon (a-Si, TF-Si).

Thin-film solar on standing seam metal roofs

With the increasing efficiencies of thin film solar, installing them on metal roofs has become cost competitive with traditional Monocrystalline and Polycrystalline solar cells.  The thin film panels are flexible and run down the standing seam metal roofs and stick to the metal roof with Adhesive, so no holes are needed to install. The connection wires run under the ridge cap at the top of the roof. Efficiency ranges from 10-18% but only costs about $2.00-$3.00 per watt of installed capacity, compared to Monocrystalline which is 	17-22% efficient and costs $3.00-$3.50 per watt of installed capacity.  Thin film solar is light weight at 7-10 ounces per square foot.  Thin film solar panels last 10-20 years but have a quicker ROI than traditional solar panels, the metal roofs last 40-70 years before replacement compared to 12-20 years for an asphalt shingle roof.

Perovskite solar cells

Concentrated solar power 

Concentrated solar power (CSP), also called "concentrated solar thermal", uses lenses or mirrors and tracking systems to concentrate sunlight, then use the resulting heat to generate electricity from conventional steam-driven turbines.

A wide range of concentrating technologies exists: among the best known are the parabolic trough, the compact linear Fresnel reflector, the dish Stirling and the solar power tower. Various techniques are used to track the sun and focus light. In all of these systems a working fluid is heated by the concentrated sunlight, and is then used for power generation or energy storage. Thermal storage efficiently allows overnight electricity generation, thus complementing PV. CSP generates a very small share of solar power and in 2022 the IEA said that CSP should be better paid for its storage.

 the levelized cost of electricity from CSP is over twice that of PV, however their very high temperatures may prove useful to help decarbonize industries (perhaps via hydrogen) which need to be hotter than electricity can provide.

Hybrid systems 

A hybrid system combines solar with energy storage and/or one or more other forms of generation. Hydro, wind and batteries are commonly combined with solar. The combined generation may enable the system to vary power output with demand, or at least smooth the solar power fluctuation. There is a lot of hydro worldwide, and adding solar panels on or around existing hydro reservoirs is particularly useful, because hydro is usually more flexible than wind and cheaper at scale than batteries, and existing power lines can sometimes be used.

Development and deployment

Early days 

The early development of solar technologies starting in the 1860s was driven by an expectation that coal would soon become scarce, such as experiments by Augustin Mouchot. Charles Fritts installed the world's first rooftop photovoltaic solar array, using 1%-efficient selenium cells, on a New York City roof in 1884. However, development of solar technologies stagnated in the early 20th century in the face of the increasing availability, economy, and utility of coal and petroleum. The first satellite with solar panels was launched in 1957.

By the 1970s, solar power was being used on satellites, but the cost of solar power was considered to be unrealistic for conventional applications. In 1974 it was estimated that only six private homes in all of North America were entirely heated or cooled by functional solar power systems. However, the 1973 oil embargo and 1979 energy crisis caused a reorganization of energy policies around the world and brought renewed attention to developing solar technologies.

Deployment strategies focused on incentive programs such as the Federal Photovoltaic Utilization Program in the US and the Sunshine Program in Japan. Other efforts included the formation of research facilities in the United States (SERI, now NREL), Japan (NEDO), and Germany (Fraunhofer ISE). 
Between 1970 and 1983 installations of photovoltaic systems grew rapidly. In the United States, President Jimmy Carter set a target of producing 20% of U.S. energy from solar by the year 2000, but his successor, Ronald Reagan, removed the funding for research into renewables. Falling oil prices in the early 1980s moderated the growth of photovoltaics from 1984 to 1996.

Mid-1990s to 2010 

In the mid-1990s development of both, residential and commercial rooftop solar as well as utility-scale photovoltaic power stations began to accelerate again due to supply issues with oil and natural gas, global warming concerns, and the improving economic position of PV relative to other energy technologies. In the early 2000s, the adoption of feed-in tariffs—a policy mechanism, that gives renewables priority on the grid and defines a fixed price for the generated electricity—led to a high level of investment security and to a soaring number of PV deployments in Europe.

2010s 
For several years, worldwide growth of solar PV was driven by European deployment, but then shifted to Asia, especially China and Japan, and to a growing number of countries and regions all over the world. The largest manufacturers were located in China. Although concentrated solar power grew more than tenfold it remained a tiny proportion of the total, because the cost of utility-scale solar PV fell by 85%, to below CSP cost which fell only 68%.

2020s 
Despite the rising cost of materials, such as polysilicon, during the 2021–2022 global energy crisis; the cost of some other energy sources, such as natural gas, rose more thus making utility scale solar the cheapest energy source in many countries. 1 TW had been installed by 2022. However growth continued to be hindered by fossil-fuel subsidies.

Current status 
About half of installed capacity is utility scale. According to the IEA not enough CSP is being built.

Forecasts 

Most new renewable capacity between 2022 and 2027 is forecast to be solar, surpassing coal as the largest source of installed power capacity. Utility scale is forecast to become the largest capacity in all regions except sub-Saharan Africa.

According to a 2021 study global electricity generation potential of rooftop solar panels is estimated at 27 PWh per year at cost ranging from $40 (Asia) to $240 per MWh (US, Europe). Its practical realization will however depend on the availability and cost of scalable electricity storage solutions.

Photovoltaic power stations

Concentrating solar power stations 

Commercial concentrating solar power (CSP) plants, also called "solar thermal power stations", were first developed in the 1980s. The 377  MW Ivanpah Solar Power Facility, located in California's Mojave Desert, is the world's largest solar thermal power plant project. Other large CSP plants include the Solnova Solar Power Station (150 MW), the Andasol solar power station (150 MW), and Extresol Solar Power Station (150 MW), all in Spain. The principal advantage of CSP is the ability to efficiently add thermal storage, allowing the dispatching of electricity over up to a 24-hour period. Since peak electricity demand typically occurs at about 5 pm, many CSP power plants use 3 to 5 hours of thermal storage.

Economics

Cost per watt
The typical cost factors for solar power include the costs of the modules, the frame to hold them, wiring, inverters, labour cost, any land that might be required, the grid connection, maintenance and the solar insolation that location will receive.

Photovoltaic systems use no fuel, and modules typically last 25 to 40 years. Thus upfront capital and financing costs make up 80 to 90% of the cost of solar power.

Some countries are considering price caps, whereas others prefer contracts for difference.

The large magnitude of solar energy available makes it a highly appealing source of electricity. In 2020, solar energy was the cheapest source of electricity. In Saudi Arabia, a power purchase agreement (PPA) was signed in April 2021 for a new solar power plant in Al-Faisaliah. The project has recorded the world’s lowest cost for solar PV electricity production of USD 1.04 cents/ kWh.

Installation prices 
Expenses of high power band solar modules has greatly decreased over time. Beginning in 1982, the cost per kW was approximately 27,000 American dollars, and in 2006 the cost dropped to approximately 4,000 American dollars per kW. The PV system in 1992 cost approximately 16,000 American dollars per kW and it dropped to approximately 6,000 American dollars per kW in 2008.

In 2021 in the US, residential solar cost from 2 to 4 dollars/watt (but solar shingles cost much more) and utility solar costs were around $1/watt.

Productivity by location

The productivity of solar power in a region depends on solar irradiance, which varies through the day and year and is influenced by latitude and climate. PV system output power also depends on ambient temperature, wind speed, solar spectrum, the local soiling conditions, and other factors.

Onshore wind power tends to be the cheapest source of electricity in Northern Eurasia, Canada, some parts of the United States, and Patagonia in Argentina: whereas in other parts of the world mostly solar power (or less often a combination of wind, solar and other low carbon energy) is thought to be best.

The locations with highest annual solar irradiance lie in the arid tropics and subtropics. Deserts lying in low latitudes usually have few clouds, and can receive sunshine for more than ten hours a day. These hot deserts form the Global Sun Belt circling the world. This belt consists of extensive swathes of land in Northern Africa, Southern Africa, Southwest Asia, Middle East, and Australia, as well as the much smaller deserts of North and South America.

So solar is (or is predicted to become) the cheapest source of energy in all of Central America, Africa, the Middle East, India, South-east Asia, Australia, and several other places.

Different measurements of solar irradiance (direct normal irradiance, global horizontal irradiance) are mapped below :

Self consumption 

In cases of self-consumption of solar energy, the payback time is calculated based on how much electricity is not purchased from the grid. However, in many cases, the patterns of generation and consumption do not coincide, and some or all of the energy is fed back into the grid. The electricity is sold, and at other times when energy is taken from the grid, electricity is bought. The relative costs and prices obtained affect the economics. In many markets, the price paid for sold PV electricity is significantly lower than the price of bought electricity, which incentivizes self consumption. Moreover, separate self consumption incentives have been used in e.g. Germany and Italy. Grid interaction regulation has also included limitations of grid feed-in in some regions in Germany with high amounts of installed PV capacity. By increasing self consumption, the grid feed-in can be limited without curtailment, which wastes electricity.

A good match between generation and consumption is key for high self-consumption. The match can be improved with batteries or controllable electricity consumption. However, batteries are expensive and profitability may require the provision of other services from them besides self consumption increase. Hot water storage tanks with electric heating with heat pumps or resistance heaters can provide low-cost storage for self consumption of solar power. Shiftable loads, such as dishwashers, tumble dryers and washing machines, can provide controllable consumption with only a limited effect on the users, but their effect on self-consumption of solar power may be limited.

Energy pricing, incentives and taxes 

The original political purpose of incentive policies for PV was to facilitate an initial small-scale deployment to begin to grow the industry, even where the cost of PV was significantly above grid parity, to allow the industry to achieve the economies of scale necessary to reach grid parity. Since reaching grid parity some policies are implemented to promote national energy independence, high tech job creation and reduction of CO2 emissions.

Three incentive mechanisms are often used in combination as investment subsidies: the authorities refund part of the cost of installation of the system, the electricity utility buys PV electricity from the producer under a multiyear contract at a guaranteed rate, and Solar Renewable Energy Certificates (SRECs).

Financial incentives for photovoltaics differ across countries, including Australia, China, Germany, India, Japan, and the United States and even across states within the US.

Net metering 

In net metering the price of the electricity produced is the same as the price supplied to the consumer, and the consumer is billed on the difference between production and consumption. Net metering can usually be done with no changes to standard electricity meters, which accurately measure power in both directions and automatically report the difference, and because it allows homeowners and businesses to generate electricity at a different time from consumption, effectively using the grid as a giant storage battery. With net metering, deficits are billed each month while surpluses are rolled over to the following month. Best practices call for perpetual roll over of kWh credits. Excess credits upon termination of service are either lost or paid for at a rate ranging from wholesale to retail rate or above, as can be excess annual credits.

Taxes 
In some countries tariffs (import taxes) are imposed on imported solar panels.

Grid integration

The overwhelming majority of electricity produced worldwide is used immediately because traditional generators can adapt to demand and storage is usually more expensive. Both solar power and wind power are sources of variable renewable power, meaning that all available output must be used locally, carried on transmission lines elsewhere to be used, or stored (e.g. in a battery). Since solar energy is not available at night, storing its energy is potentially an important issue particularly in off-grid and for future 100% renewable energy scenarios to have continuous electricity availability.

Solar electricity is inherently variable but somewhat predictable by time of day, location, and seasons. Solar is intermittent due to day/night cycles and unpredictable weather. How much of a special challenge solar power is in any given electric utility varies significantly. In places with hot summers and mild winters, solar is well matched to daytime cooling demands.

Conventional hydroelectric dams work very well in conjunction with solar power; water can be held back or released from a reservoir as required. Where suitable geography is not available, pumped-storage hydroelectricity can use solar power to pump water to a high reservoir on sunny days, then the energy is recovered at night and in bad weather by releasing water via a hydroelectric plant to a low reservoir where the cycle can begin again.

Energy storage 
Concentrated solar power plants may use thermal storage to store solar energy, such as in high-temperature molten salts. These salts are an effective storage medium because they are low-cost, have a high specific heat capacity, and can deliver heat at temperatures compatible with conventional power systems. This method of energy storage is used, for example, by the Solar Two power station, allowing it to store 1.44 TJ in its 68 m3 storage tank, enough to provide full output for close to 39 hours, with an efficiency of about 99%.

In stand alone PV systems batteries are traditionally used to store excess electricity. With grid-connected photovoltaic power system, excess electricity can be sent to the electrical grid. Net metering and feed-in tariff programs give these systems a credit for the electricity they produce. This credit offsets electricity provided from the grid when the system cannot meet demand, effectively trading with the grid instead of storing excess electricity. 
When wind and solar are a small fraction of the grid power, other generation techniques can adjust their output appropriately, but as these forms of variable power grow, additional balance on the grid is needed. As prices are rapidly declining, PV systems increasingly use rechargeable batteries to store a surplus to be later used at night. Batteries used for grid-storage can stabilize the electrical grid by leveling out peak loads for a few hours. In the future, less expensive batteries could play an important role on the electrical grid, as they can charge during periods when generation exceeds demand and feed their stored energy into the grid when demand is higher than generation.

Common battery technologies used in today's home PV systems include nickel-cadmium, lead-acid, nickel metal hydride, and lithium-ion.Lithium-ion batteries have the potential to replace lead-acid batteries in the near future, as they are being intensively developed and lower prices are expected due to economies of scale provided by large production facilities such as the Gigafactory 1. In addition, the Li-ion batteries of plug-in electric cars may serve as future storage devices in a vehicle-to-grid system. Since most vehicles are parked an average of 95% of the time, their batteries could be used to let electricity flow from the car to the power lines and back. Other rechargeable batteries used for distributed PV systems include, sodium–sulfur and vanadium redox batteries, two prominent types of a molten salt and a flow battery, respectively.

Other technologies 
In an electricity system without grid energy storage, generation from stored fuels (coal, biomass, natural gas, nuclear) must go up and down in reaction to the rise and fall of solar electricity (see load following power plant). While hydroelectric and natural gas plants can quickly respond to changes in load, coal, biomass and nuclear plants usually take considerable time to respond to load and can only be scheduled to follow the predictable variation. Depending on local circumstances, beyond about 20–40% of total generation, grid-connected intermittent sources like solar tend to require investment in some combination of grid interconnections, energy storage or demand side management. In countries with high solar generation, such as Australia, electricity prices may become negative in the middle of the day when solar generation is high, thus incentivizing new battery storage.

The combination of wind and solar PV has the advantage that the two sources complement each other because the peak operating times for each system occur at different times of the day and year. The power generation of such solar hybrid power systems is therefore more constant and fluctuates less than each of the two component subsystems. Solar power is seasonal, particularly in northern/southern climates, away from the equator, suggesting a need for long term seasonal storage in a medium such as hydrogen or pumped hydroelectric.

Environmental effects 

A very small proportion of solar power is concentrated solar power. Concentrated solar power may use much more water than gas-fired power. This can be a problem, as this type of solar power needs strong sunlight so is often built in deserts.

Solar power is cleaner than electricity from fossil fuels: solar power does not lead to any harmful emissions during operation, but the production of the panels leads to some amount of pollution. A 2021 study estimated the carbon footprint of manufacturing monocrystalline panels at 515 g CO2/kWp in the US and 740 g CO2/kWp in China, but this is expected to fall as manufacturers use more clean electricity and recycled materials. Solar power carries an upfront cost to the environment via production with a carbon payback time of a few years , but offers clean energy for the rest of its 30 year lifetime.

The life-cycle greenhouse-gas emissions of solar farms are less than 50 gram (g) per kilowatt-hour (kWh), but with battery storage could be up to 150 g/kWh. In contrast, a combined cycle gas-fired power plant without carbon capture and storage emits around 500 g/kWh, and a coal-fired power plant about 1000 g/kWh. Similar to all energy sources where their total life cycle emissions are mostly from construction, the switch to low carbon power in the manufacturing and transportation of solar devices would further reduce carbon emissions.

Life-cycle surface power density of solar power varies a lot but averages about 7 W/m2, compared to about 240 for nuclear power and 480 for gas. However when the land required for gas extraction and processing is accounted for gas power is estimated to have not much higher power density than solar. PV requires much larger amounts of land surface to produce the same nominal amount of energy as sources with higher surface power density and capacity factor. According to a 2021 study, obtaining 25 to 80% of electricity from solar farms in their own territory by 2050 would require the panels to cover land ranging from 0.5 to 2.8% of the European Union, 0.3 to 1.4% in India, and 1.2 to 5.2% in Japan and South Korea. Occupation of such large areas for PV farms could drive residential opposition as well as lead to deforestation, removal of vegetation and conversion of farm land. However some countries, such as South Korea and Japan, use land for agriculture under PV, or floating solar. Worldwide land use has minimal ecological impact. Land use can be reduced to the level of gas power by installing on buildings and other built up areas.

Harmful materials are used in the production of solar panels, but in generally in small amounts.   the environmental impact of perovskite is hard to estimate, but there is some concern that lead may become a problem. A 2021 International Energy Agency study projects the demand for copper will double by 2040. The study cautions that supply needs to increase rapidly to match demand from large-scale deployment of solar and required grid upgrades. More tellurium and indium may also be needed and recycling may help.

As solar panels are sometimes replaced with more efficient panels, the second-hand panels are sometimes reused in developing countries, for example in Africa. Several countries have specific regulations for the recycling of solar panels. Although maintenance cost is already low compared to other energy sources, some academics have called for solar power systems to be designed to be more repairable.

Political issues 
 over 40% of global polysilicon manufacturing capacity is in Xinjiang in China, which raises concerns about human rights violations (Xinjang internment camps) as well as  supply chain dependency. However solar cannot be cut off, unlike oil and gas, so can contribute to energy security.

See also

 100% renewable energy
 Cost of electricity by source
 Index of solar energy articles
 List of cities by sunshine duration
 List of photovoltaic power stations
 List of solar thermal power stations
 Renewable energy commercialization
 Solar energy
 Solar lamp
 Solar vehicle
 Sustainable energy
 Thin-film solar cell
 Timeline of solar cells

References

Further reading

External links
 Solar energy and the environment at U.S. Energy Information Administration

Bright green environmentalism
 
Energy conversion
Sustainable energy
Power
Renewable energy